The U.S. Pond Hockey Championships are an annual pond hockey event on Lake Nokomis in Minneapolis, Minnesota. Though an amateur tournament, the competition draws hockey enthusiasts from all over North America, many of whom have pro and college hockey experience.

ESPN.com listed the tournament as part of their "101 Things Sports Fans Must Experience Before They Die."

Format

The tournament includes competition in six divisions:

 The Open Division (anyone can play)
 40+ Division
 50+ Division
 Rink Rats (amateurs who would rather not face the near-pro talent that is common in the Open Division)
 Women's
 Seniors
 Bender 
The Bender Division is for the beautiful late bloomers of the Pond. Boys and girls who got in to hockey long after the glory days of high school were gone. 

The teams compete for a trophy called the Golden Shovel. Each year, the winners of each division get to engrave their names into the Golden Shovel in a tradition reminiscent of the NHL's Stanley Cup.

Past winners (Open Division)

Tournaments

2006 Tournament

2007 Tournament
Due to the unusually warm weather in Minnesota during the winter of 2006–2007, tournament sponsors moved the tournament from Lake Calhoun to Lake Nokomis. Notable players in the 2007 tournament include:
Phil Housley
Brad Bombardir
Guy Kawasaki

2008 Tournament

2009 Tournament

2010 Tournament

2011 Tournament
Held January 21–23, 2011 on Lake Nokomis.

2012 Tournament

See also
 Canadian National Pond Hockey Championships
 World Pond Hockey Championships

References

External links
 U.S. Pond Hockey Championships Web Site

Ice hockey tournaments in the United States
Pond hockey
2006 establishments in Minnesota
Recurring sporting events established in 2006